Carl Engström (born September 26, 1991) is a Swedish professional basketball player.

College statistics

External links
 Eurobasket.com profile
 RealGM profile
 
 

1991 births
Living people
Alabama Crimson Tide men's basketball players
BC Nevėžis players
Centers (basketball)
Korvpalli Meistriliiga players
People from Ystad
Palencia Baloncesto players
Södertälje Kings players
Swedish men's basketball players
Swedish expatriate basketball people in Estonia
Swedish expatriate basketball people in Lithuania
Swedish expatriate basketball people in Saudi Arabia
Swedish expatriate basketball people in Spain
Swedish expatriate basketball people in the United States
University of Tartu basketball team players
Uppsala Basket players